Otor Udu is a town in Nigeria that is the ancestral home of people connected or 
related to Udu.
In late 2016 Otor-Udu and other Udu communities were engaged in a border dispute with Ughievwen communities in Ughelli South LGAs of Delta State

See also
 Udu, Nigeria

References

Populated places in Delta State